Christofer Bergenblock (born 1974) is a Swedish politician.  he serves as Member of the Riksdag representing the constituency of Halland County. He is affiliated with the Centre Party.

References 

Living people
1974 births
Place of birth missing (living people)
21st-century Swedish politicians
Members of the Riksdag 2022–2026
Members of the Riksdag from the Centre Party (Sweden)